Piquet Carneiro is a municipality in the state of Ceará in the Northeast region of Brazil.

See also
List of municipalities in Ceará

References

Municipalities in Ceará